GMA Integrated News and Public Affairs (formerly known as RBS News Department, GMA Radio-Television News and GMA Rainbow Satellite News; and later GMA News and Public Affairs and commonly GMA (Integrated) News) is the news division of the GMA Network Inc.

The division produces news, public affairs, infotainment, and lately, sports and entertainment programs for free-to-air TV channels (GMA Network and GTV), national radio station (Super Radyo DZBB 594) owned and affiliated regional television and radio stations in the Philippines, and international TV channels (GMA Pinoy TV, GMA Life TV and GMA News TV International).

History

Public affairs division 
GMA's Public Affairs division was established in 1987 when Tina Monzon-Palma, then head of GMA News, recognized that a 30-minute newscast was not adequate and sufficient to inform the general Filipino public on what is happening to the recently established Aquino government after the historic People Power Revolution in February 1986. The public affairs division started with five news personnel including Marissa La Torre Flores (who would later lead GMA News and Public Affairs as its senior vice president until 2022) and held office inside the cameramen's locker room before moving into the state-of-the-art GMA Network Center with no experience, equipment, camera and an improvised set broadcasting at the old GMA building in EDSA with only a passion-to-work attitude. Today this division, with more than 500 news personnel—both locally based and with international assignments—and producing 16 of the most awarded programs on Philippine television today, is one of the more active.

Weekend with Velez was the first network-produced public affairs program on GMA, afterward renamed Velez This Week and was hosted by Jose Mari Velez. 

From a makeshift and improvised set, the once GMA News garnered several honors and recognitions from local and international award-giving bodies, including two gold medals in the New York Festivals and their first Peabody Award in 1999.

Coinciding with its 20th anniversary in broadcasting excellence, GMA News and Public Affairs aired a documentary entitled 20: Dalawampung Taon ng GMA Public Affairs (20: Twenty Years of GMA Public Affairs) on October 28, 2007.

On April 27, 2020, GMA News and Public Affairs Digital launched a podcast channel available on Spotify and Apple Podcast.

GMA Integrated News 
In late-October 2022, GMA News was rebranded as "GMA Integrated News", in an effort to emphasise the combined resources of its television, digital, radio and regional platforms. First Vice President and Head of GMA Regional TV and Synergy Oliver Victor B. Amoroso was appointed as the Acting Head of GMA Integrated News following its rebranding.

Accolades 
In 1999, George Foster Peabody Award recognized the documentaries "Kidneys for Sale" and "Kamao" by Jessica Soho and the I-Witness team and Jay Taruc's child labor story on Brigada Siete. On December 9, 2003, the Philippine House of Representatives 12th Congress commended GMA News and Public Affairs through Resolution 787 authored by Rep. Rodolfo Plaza for its efforts in uplifting the standards of the Philippine broadcast industry by receiving the first Peabody Award for television news awarded to an Asian country in 1999. In 2010, Kara David's I-Witness documentary, "Ambulansiyang de Paa," won GMA News and Public Affairs second Peabody Award. GMA News TV's documentary program Reel Times "Salat" episode received a Peabody Award in 2013. In 2014, Peabody awards recognized GMA News' State of the Nation with Jessica Soho, 24 Oras, Saksi, 24 Oras Weekend and Kapuso Mo, Jessica Soho for its coverage of the Super Typhoon Yolanda (Haiyan).

 Im Ready 
Im Ready or IMReady is a public safety and preparedness campaign of GMA News and Public Affairs launched on 2010. It is the country’s first 24/7, one-stop shop for public safety information.

Im Ready was forged through a partnership between GMA and several government agencies including DOST-PAGASA and Metro Manila Development Authority (MMDA). It also draws support from GMA’s collaboration with Google and Waze, the leading traffic navigation app.

On 2014, GMA New Media, the technology and digital arm of GMA launched the mobile application IMReady where in users can see real-time information and updates including weather, traffic situations, and news alerts. It is available on iOS and Android phones.

 Programs 
 Currently aired GMA NetworkGTVRegional Programs (GMA Regional TV)At Home with GMA Regional TV (GMA Davao, GMA Cagayan de Oro, GMA Zamboanga and GMA General Santos)
Balitang Bicolandia (GMA Bicol)
Balitang Bisdak (GMA Cebu)
Balitang Southern Tagalog (GMA Batangas)
Byaheng DO30 (GMA Davao, GMA Cagayan de Oro, GMA Zamboanga and GMA General Santos)
GMA Regional TV Early Edition (GMA Bacolod and GMA Iloilo)
GMA Regional TV Live! (GMA Cebu)
Mornings with GMA Regional TV (GMA Dagupan and GMA Ilocos)
One Mindanao (GMA Davao, GMA Cagayan de Oro, GMA Zamboanga and GMA General Santos)
One North Central Luzon (GMA Dagupan and GMA Ilocos)
One Western Visayas (GMA Bacolod and GMA Iloilo)
Regional TV News (GTV)Online(officially branded as GMA News and Public Affairs Digital and GMA Online Exclusives)
 Stand For Truth (YouTube, airs weeknights on GTV)
 Adulting with Atom Araullo (YouTube)
 All Access with Joyce Pring (YouTube)
 ExB Rules (YouTube)
 Fact or Fake with Joseph Morong (YouTube)
 #FYI with Richard Heydarian (YouTube)
 @gmanews #tweetcap (Twitter)
 #GMAnewsfeed (Facebook)
 #Goals with Gabbi Garcia (YouTube)
 TasteMNL with Arra San Agustin (YouTube)
 Thousanaire with Reese Tuazon (YouTube)

 Defunct programs 

 Defunct regional newscasts 
24 Oras Amianan (GMA 10 Dagupan)
24 Oras Bikol (GMA 7 Naga) – reverted to Balitang Bicolandia
24 Oras Central Visayas (GMA 7 Cebu) – reverted to Balitang Bisdak
24 Oras Davao (GMA 5 Davao) 
24 Oras Ilokano (GMA 5 Laoag)
24 Oras North Central Luzon (GMA 10 Dagupan)
24 Oras Northern Mindanao (GMA 12 and 35 Cagayan de Oro)
24 Oras Southern Mindanao (GMA 5 Davao)
24 Oras Western Visayas (GMA 6 Iloilo)
Balitang Amianan (GMA 10 Dagupan) – reverted to One North Central Luzon
Balitang Ilokano (GMA 5 Laoag and 48 Ilocos Sur/Abra)
Baretang Bikol (GMA 7 Naga)
Ratsada (GMA 6 Iloilo)
Ratsada 24 Oras (GMA 6 Iloilo)
Testigo (GMA 5 Davao) – reverted to One Mindanao
Testigo Northern Mindanao (GMA 12 and 35 Cagayan de Oro)

 Defunct regional public affairs shows 
Arangkada (GMA 6 Iloilo)
Buena Mano Balita (GMA 7 Cebu)  – reverted to GMA Regional TV Live!
Isyu Ngayon
Isyu Karon Socsksargen (GMA 8 General Santos)
Isyu Karon Southern Mindanao (GMA 5 Davao)
Isyu Karon Northern Mindanao (GMA 12 and 35 Cagayan de Oro)
Isyu Karon Central Visayas (GMA 7 Cebu)
Isyu Mindanao (GMA 5 Davao, GMA 35 Cagayan de Oro and GMA General Santos)
Isyu Ngayon North Central Luzon (GMA 10 Dagupan)
Isyu Ngonian Bicolandia (GMA 7 Naga and GMA 12 Legazpi)
Isyu Subong Ilonggo (GMA 6 Iloilo)
Isyu Subong Negrense (GMA 13 and 30 Bacolod)  – reverted to One Western Visayas as Newscast
Isyu ug Istorya (GMA 5 Davao, GMA 35  Cagayan de Oro and GMA 8 General Santos)
Primera Balita (GMA 10 Dagupan)  – reverted to Mornings With GMA Regional TV.
Una Ka BAI (GMA 5 Davao)  – reverted to At Home With GMA Regional TV.

Current PersonalitiesFlagship NewscastsGMA NetworkMike Enriquez
Mel Tiangco
Vicky Morales
Ivan Mayrina 
Pia Arcangel

 Arnold Clavio
 Susan Enriquez
 Mariz UmaliGTV Raffy Tima
 Connie Sison

 Atom Araullo
 Maki PulidoRegional Flagship NewscastsOne North Central Luzon CJ Torida
 Joanne Ponsoy
 Harold Reyes
 Ivy HernandoBalitang Southern Tagalog Ivy Saunar-Gasang
 Ace MedranoBalitang Bicolandia 

 Jessie Cruzat
 Kate DelovieresBalitang Bisdak Alan Domingo
 Lou Anne Mae Rondina
 Cecille Quibod-CastroOne Western Visayas 

 Adrian Prietos 
 Kaitlene RivillaOne Mindanao Sarah Hilomen-Velasco
 Cyril Chaves
 Efren Mamac
 Jestoni JumamilRegional Morning ShowsMornings With GMA Regional TV Joanne Ponsoy
 Harold ReyesGMA Regional TV Live! Nikko Sereno
 Cecille Quibod-Castro.GMA Regional TV Early Edition Adrian Prietos
 Kaitlene RivillaAt Home With GMA Regional TV'' Jandi Esteban
 Cyril Chaves 
 Krissa Marie Dapitan
 Abbey Caballero

Current Roster of Journalists and Correspondents Main RosterGMA Regional TV Correspondents'''

References

External links 

Official website of GMA News' Youscoop